Walid Bahij Ismail (born 10 November 1984) is a Lebanese professional footballer who plays as a left-back.

Ismail began his career in Lebanon at Islah Borj Shmali, before playing for Racing Beirut and then Nejmeh, with whom he won the 2013–14 league title. In 2014 he moved to Zob Ahan in Iran, winning two consecutive Hazfi Cup titles—in 2014–15 and 2015–16. Ismail returned to Lebanon in 2016, playing for Safa, Salam Zgharta, Bourj and Sagesse.

He is one of his country's most capped players, having represented Lebanon internationally 68 times between 2010 and 2019. Ismail participated at the 2011, 2015, and 2019 AFC Asian Cup qualifications, and the 2014 and 2018 FIFA World Cup qualifications. He has also played at the 2019 AFC Asian Cup, in Lebanon's first participation through qualification.

Club career
Starting his career at Islah Borj Shmali in the Lebanese Second Division, Ismail played for Lebanese Premier League side Racing Beirut, before moving to Nejmeh in 2013 where he won one league title, one Super Cup, one Elite Cup and helped them reach the round of 16 of the 2013 AFC Cup. In 2014, he moved to Iranian club Zob Ahan with whom he won two Hazfi Cups and played in the AFC Champions League.

In 2016 he returned to Lebanon at Safa, where he spent two seasons, before joining Salam Zgharta in 2018. On 3 June 2019, Ismail joined newly promoted side Bourj. Ismail moved to newly-promoted side Sagesse on 12 June 2021, on a one-year deal. He left the club on 13 July 2022.

International career
Ismail represented Lebanon at the 2019 AFC Asian Cup. On 21 January 2019, Ismail announced his retirement from international football.

Playing style 
While not a fast left-back, Ismail is known for his calmness and experience on the field.

Career statistics

International
Scores and results list Lebanon's goal tally first, score column indicates score after each Ismail goal.

Honours
Nejmeh
 Lebanese Premier League: 2013–14

Zob Ahan
 Hazfi Cup: 2014–15, 2015–16

Individual
 Lebanese Premier League Team of the Season: 2012–13, 2013–14

See also
 List of Lebanon international footballers

References

External links

 
 Walid Ismail at RSSSF
 
 
 
 

1984 births
Living people
Footballers from Beirut
Lebanese footballers
Association football fullbacks
Islah Borj Al Shmali Club players
Racing Club Beirut players
Nejmeh SC players
Zob Ahan Esfahan F.C. players
Safa SC players
Salam Zgharta FC players
Bourj FC players
Sagesse SC footballers
Lebanese Second Division players
Lebanese Premier League players
Persian Gulf Pro League players
Lebanon international footballers
2019 AFC Asian Cup players
Lebanese expatriate footballers
Lebanese expatriate sportspeople in Iran
Expatriate footballers in Iran